

This is a list of the National Register of Historic Places listings in Litchfield County, Connecticut.

This is intended to be a complete list of the properties and districts on the National Register of Historic Places in Litchfield County, Connecticut, United States. The locations of National Register properties and districts for which the latitude and longitude coordinates are included below, may be seen in an online map.

There are 174 properties and districts listed on the National Register in the county, including 4 National Historic Landmarks.

Current listings

|}

*Addresses of listed places in Winchester are "Winsted, CT"

See also

List of National Historic Landmarks in Connecticut
National Register of Historic Places listings in Connecticut

References

 

Litchfield